Damelia is a genus of leaf beetles in the subfamily Eumolpinae. It is known from Fiji and Solomon Islands.

Species
 Damelia cyanea Bryant, 1937
 Damelia leveri Bryant, 1937
 Damelia marshalli Clark, 1864
 Damelia metallica Bryant, 1937
 Damelia rugosa Bryant, 1957
 Damelia salomonensis Bryant, 1937
 Damelia verrucosa Bryant, 1957

References

Eumolpinae
Chrysomelidae genera
Beetles of Oceania
Insects of Fiji
Insects of the Solomon Islands
Taxa named by Hamlet Clark